The Bashful Buzzard is a 7-minute animated cartoon completed in 1944 and released on September 15, 1945. It is directed by Robert Clampett and is the second to feature the character Beaky Buzzard. This is the last cartoon in which Kent Rogers performed voices, as he died in a training flight accident on July 9, 1944.

Plot
Beaky Buzzard's mother sends him and his brothers out with the mission of bringing home something to eat. While his brothers wreak havoc dive-bombing various creatures and eventually bring back a milk cow (along with the farmer), a string of circus elephants (including a baby one brandishing a banner reading "I am NOT Dumbo", a reference to the Disney film of the same name), and a dog (clinging to a fire hydrant), Beaky manages only to capture a baby bumblebee. 

While flying back carrying his "prey", Beaky sings "I'm bringing home a baby bumble bee" to the tune of "The Arkansas Traveler".  A larger bee, presumably the parent, arrives and stings Beaky, who crash lands and is able to sooth his sting in some water. While there, a small head pops out from behind rocks. Beaky picks a fight with the animal he calls "Shorty". He yanks on the head and tries to lift it from the ground before realizing that what he is confronting is actually a large dragon. 

Beaky runs from the dragon, and the scene changes to the mother buzzard worrying late into the night about him not returning home. When he arrives she is both glad that he showed up and angry that he seemingly brought nothing for dinner. However, when the camera moves down, it is revealed that Beaky caught the dragon, who dismisses the mother's claim by saying "Well now, I wouldn't say that!" (a la Mr. Peavey of The Great Gildersleeve).

References

External links
 The Bashful Buzzard at the IMDB

1945 animated films
1945 short films
1945 films
Looney Tunes shorts
Warner Bros. Cartoons animated short films
Films directed by Bob Clampett
Beaky Buzzard films
1940s Warner Bros. animated short films
Animated films about dragons